Weekend is an American television newsmagazine program that aired on NBC from 1974 to 1979.  It originally aired once monthly on Saturday nights from 11:30 p.m. to 1 a.m. Eastern time, the same time slot as Saturday repeats of The Tonight Show Starring Johnny Carson during its first season, then to replace Saturday Night Live, once a month on those weekends when the SNL cast was not producing a show. The program was awarded a George Foster Peabody medal in 1975 and attracted a cult following.

Overview 

The program was hosted by Lloyd Dobyns, who also did much of the reporting. The show's creator and executive producer was past (and future) president of NBC News, Reuven Frank. Together, Dobyns and Frank were largely responsible for the distinctive writing and quirky style of the program. The opening theme was the guitar intro to "Jumpin' Jack Flash" by The Rolling Stones. As a forward-focused executive, Frank brought in a woman, Clare Crawford-Mason, as the show's producer.

In 1978, after four years of critical success and moderately good ratings for that hour, NBC moved Weekend to prime time. After airing once a month in various time slots in September, October, and November, the network placed the program weekly on Sunday nights at 10 P.M. Eastern time starting in December 1978. Linda Ellerbee was added as Dobyns' co-host and co-lead reporter.  Placed against strong programs on ABC and CBS, the show eventually died of poor ratings. A few years later, Ellerbee and Dobyns reunited to anchor another late-night NBC news program, NBC News Overnight.

The program was known for an offbeat format, a somewhat less serious tone than such programs as 60 Minutes; comic relief included the use of humorous images (e.g., a trio of magazine covers, New York, The New Yorker,
and the completely fictitious New Yorkest), and the occasional animated cartoon, such as Mr. Hipp.  At the end of each broadcast, until the program began airing weekly, a sequence would be played of a rotating phonograph record with voiceover explaining when the next broadcast would take place.

In the spring of 1978, when Weekend'''s late-night run ended, Dobyns noted that "Your Subscription Has Expired", but stated that Weekend would be back that fall, in prime-time.

At the end of the last broadcast in 1979, the voice intoned, "...there will be no more Weekends''."

References

1974 American television series debuts
1979 American television series endings
American late-night television shows
1970s American television news shows
NBC late-night programming
NBC original programming
NBC News
Peabody Award-winning television programs
1970s American late-night television series